Luis C. Nuñez Astrain  is a linguist and sociologist, and was editor of the newspaper Egin.

He has a Bachelor of Arts in Linguistics and Sociology from the Sorbonne.

Bibliography 
 Así está la enseñanza primaria (1969)
 Euskara gaur (1971)
 Fonología consonántica de un dialecto del euskera de Zuberoa (1976) , Vol. 10, Nº. 1, 1976, pp. 153–198
 Clases sociales en Euskadi (1997), Txertoa  ("Social Classes in Basque Country")  
 Opresión y defensa del euskera (1977), Txertoa  ("Oppression and defense of the Basque language") 
 La sociedad vasca actual (1977), Txertoa   
 Estatuto de la mayoria?, Punto y Hora, 1-8 Nov. 1979
 Euskadi Sur Electoral (1980)  
 Euskadi eta Askatasuna/Euskal Herria y la libertad (1993, 8 volumes), Txalaparta
 la razón vasca (1995), Txalaparta; foreword by Gilles Perrault.  
 La Raó basca : el País Basc, un poble que ens amaguen (1997), Catalan, Txalaparta. .
 The Basques : their struggle for independence (1997), Welsh Academic Press,  trans. from the French by Meic Stephens.  Foreword by Ned Thomas 
 La ragione basca (1999), trans. Marco Alciati, Roberta Gozzi. Milano : Punto Rosso
 El euskera arcaico. extensión y parentescos (November, 2003), Txalaparta.   ("The Archaic Euskera")
 Parentescos y antigua extensión del euskera (2003)  , Nº. 17, 2003, pp. 9–300
 Antzinako euskaraz (2004)

See also 
 Aquitanian language

References

External links 
 Deia newspaper article
 El Independentismo Radical Vasco. Una visión desde arriba 
 The Basques: Their Struggle for Independence 
 Luis Núñez Astrain, Bibliography
 Cuatrocientos nombres vascos al norte de los Pirineos, Diario Vasco
 Associazione Culturale Punto Rosso pelease for Italian translation La ragione basca, Brianza Popolare

University of Paris alumni
Living people
Linguists from Spain
Spanish sociologists
Spanish expatriates in France
Year of birth missing (living people)